Frances Rose McIver (born 10 October 1988) is a New Zealand actress. She starred as Olivia "Liv" Moore in The CW supernatural comedy-drama series iZombie (2015–2019) and played Summer Landsdown the Yellow Ranger in Power Rangers RPM (2009).  She also played the role of Amber Moore in the romantic comedy film A Christmas Prince (2017) and its two sequels The Royal Wedding (2018), and The Royal Baby (2019).

McIver began her career with guest appearances in New Zealand-based series, such as Xena: Warrior Princess, Hercules: The Legendary Journeys and Legend of the Seeker. She also had recurring roles in the Showtime period drama series Masters of Sex (2013–14) and the ABC fantasy adventure drama series Once Upon a Time (2013–2017). She is currently starring in the CBS supernatural sitcom Ghosts (2021–present).

McIver made her film debut in the period drama The Piano (1993). She has since starred in the drama The Lovely Bones (2009), the horror comedy Predicament (2010), the sports drama Blinder (2013), the romance drama Petals on the Wind (2014) and the musical drama Daffodils (2019).

Early life
McIver was born in Auckland and was raised in Titirangi by her father, John George Whitfield "Mac" McIver (b. 1951), a photographer, and her mother, Ann "Annie" (née Coney), an artist. Her parents still reside in the house in which she grew up. She has an older brother, Paul McIver, who is a musician and former actor. She studied ballet and jazz dance until she was thirteen.

McIver attended Avondale College and was a prefect in her final year. She graduated in 2006. She  studied at the University of Auckland, and majored in Psychology and Linguistics, but did not complete her degree. Between acting jobs, she was a babysitter and worked part-time importing bananas with Fair Trade. She took part in their "All Good Bananas" promotion, as the voice of the listener's conscience.

Career
At the age of two, McIver began appearing in commercials. At the age of three, she received the role of an angel in the film The Piano.

McIver has mostly worked for New Zealand television, from fantasy-based series like Maddigan's Quest to dramas such as Rude Awakenings. She has also starred in television films such as the Hercules film series and Maiden Voyage, as well as two Disney Channel films: Eddie's Million Dollar Cook-Off in 2003, and Johnny Kapahala: Back on Board in 2007, which is the sequel to the 1999 film Johnny Tsunami. From March to December 2009, she played Ranger Yellow Summer Landsdown in the television series Power Rangers RPM for 32 episodes.

McIver's big screen debut was in Peter Jackson's film adaptation of The Lovely Bones, which received its U.S. release on 11 December 2009. In the film, she played Lindsey Salmon, the younger sister of the main character.

McIver appeared in the film Predicament, based on the novel by Ronald Hugh Morrieson, which was released in New Zealand and Australia on 26 August 2010. Filming took place in July and August 2009 in the towns of Hawera and Eltham. In 2011, McIver appeared in the television film Tangiwai, based on the 1953 Tangiwai rail disaster. In the film, she played Nerissa Love, the fiancée of New Zealand cricketer Bob Blair and one of the victims of the disaster. She also had a role in the comedy series Super City, playing cheerleader Candice.

From 19 March to 10 April 2010 she appeared on stage at the Herald Theatre as Izzy, the best friend of the main character in That Face. McIver was also selected to participate in the 2010 Show Me Shorts Film Festival.

McIver put her studies at the University of Auckland on hold, and traveled to Los Angeles for "a couple of top-secret projects". She was cast opposite Chris Lowell in the indie film Light Years. McIver was also cast in Australian rules football film, Blinder, which began filming in Torquay on 20 February 2012, before moving to Boston. The film was scheduled for release in 2013.

McIver was cast as the lead character in MTV's Cassandra French's Finishing School for Boys, based on the book by Eric Garcia and produced by Garcia and Krysten Ritter. McIver was also cast as a recurring character on Showtime's Masters of Sex, which is based on the book Masters of Sex: The Life and Times of William Masters and Virginia Johnson, the Couple Who Taught America How to Love by Thomas Maier. The drama began filming in New York City in March, and began to air in September 2013.

In July 2013, it was announced that McIver landed the role of Tinker Bell for a multi-episode story arc on the series Once Upon a Time. In January 2017, it was announced that McIver would reprise her role in season 6.

In February 2014, McIver was cast as the adult Cathy Dollanganger in the Lifetime television film Petals on the Wind, adapted from the book by V. C. Andrews.

In March 2014, McIver was announced to star in CW's new series iZombie as Olivia "Liv" Moore, which premiered a year later on 17 March 2015. The series concluded after five seasons with 71 episodes on 1 August 2019.

In March 2017, it was reported that McIver was in Romania, filming A Christmas Prince for Netflix which was released 17 November 2017. She reprised her role as Amber Moore in the 2018 sequel film A Christmas Prince: The Royal Wedding and the 2019 threequel A Christmas Prince: The Royal Baby.

McIver has been cast in the musical feature, Daffodils. Filming began February 2018 in Wellington, Waikato, and Wairarapa, and was released in New Zealand and Australia in 2019.

In March 2020, it was reported that McIver was cast as one of the leads in the CBS sitcom Ghosts. It premiered on 7 October 2021.

McIver is also an ambassador for Emirates airlines.

Personal life 
McIver enjoys writing, and is inspired by the works of John Steinbeck, Wally Lamb and Franz Kafka. She also enjoys crossword puzzles and Sudoku.

Filmography

Film

Television

Video games

Music videos

Other works

Theatre

Awards and nominations

References

External links
 
 Rose McIver at the NZ on Screen
 
 
Rose McIver Online | rose-mciver.com, rose-mciver.net ( fansite)
Rose McIver Source | rosemciversource.net, mciver-rose.com ( fansite)

1988 births
20th-century New Zealand actresses
21st-century New Zealand actresses
Living people
New Zealand child actresses
New Zealand expatriate actresses in the United States
New Zealand film actresses
New Zealand people of Scottish descent
New Zealand television actresses
People educated at Avondale College
People from Auckland
University of Auckland alumni